The South Face of Charlotte Dome is a technical alpine rock climbing route. It is featured in Fifty Classic Climbs of North America. Chris Jones, a member of the first ascent party, wrote that "in Yosemite, the climb would be recognized as one of the best in the Valley. In the backcountry it will probably remain unknown."

References

External links 
supertopo
rockclimbing.com
mountainproject.com
summitpost.org

Climbing routes